The 2sunhwan-ro(), also called Gwangju Loop 2, is a 6-lane highway located in Gwangju, Republic of Korea. this route circulates suburbs with Dountown of Gwangju, with a total length of .

History 
1 October 1992 : Under construction.
January 1995 : East Gwangju ~ Gakhwa section opens to traffic.
15 January 1995 : Jiwon ~ Hyodeok section opens to traffic.
1 May 1998 : Gakhwa ~ Duam section opens to traffic.
1 January 2001 : Duam ~ Jiwon section opens to traffic.
5 March 2002 : Pungam ~ Seochang section opens to traffic.
15 October 2004 : Pungam ~ Hyodeok section opens to traffic.
15 May 2007 : Sanwol JCT ~ Seochang section opens to traffic.
19 September 2009 : Munheung JCT ~ Gakhwa section opens to traffic.

List of facilities 
 IC: Interchange, JC: Junction, SA: Service Area, TG: Tollgate

See also
Gwangju
Mujin-daero
Bitgoeul-daero
1sunhwan-ro (Gwangju)
2sunhwan-ro (Cheongju) - same name.
3sunhwan-ro (Cheongju) - same function in Cheongju.
4sunhwan-ro (Daegu) - same function in Daegu. Connected with Daegu Ring Expressway.

1995 establishments in South Korea
Roads in Gwangju